Martine Brochard (born 2 April 1944) is a French actress and writer.

Life and career 
Born in Paris, Brochard debuted in 1968 in a minor role in François Truffaut's Baisers volés. In 1970, she moved to Italy, where she became a minor star in genre films, including poliziotteschi, commedia sexy all'italiana and giallo films.  From the mid 70's, she regularly appears in Italian TV-series and on stage.

In 1995 and 1999, she released two collection of stories for children, La gallina blu e altri racconti (Mursia)  and Zaffiretto il vampiretto e altri racconti (Mursia).

In 2003, Brochard was diagnosed with leukemia, a disease from which she was able to recover.

Filmography

Baisers volés (1968) 
La Main noire (1968)
Béru et ces dames (1968)
Le Socrate (1968) 
Les Cinq Dernières Minutes (1968) TV 
Le Survivant (1969) TV 
Eine Rose für Jane (1970) TV 
L'amour (1970) 
I giovedì della signora Giulia (1970) TV
Trastevere (1971) (cut scenes) 
All'ultimo minuto (1971) TV 
Face aux Lancaster (1971) TV 
Armiamoci e partite! (1971) 
The Violent Professionals (1973) 
La ragazza fuoristrada (1973) 
The Nun and the Devil (1973) 
 No, the Case Is Happily Resolved (1973)
Story of a Cloistered Nun (1973) 
La nottata (1974) 
Il domestico (1974) 
Prigione di donne (1974) 
La governante (1974) 
Savage Three (1975)
Il fidanzamento (1975) 
Eyeball (1975) 
Il solco di pesca (1975) 
A Woman at Her Window (1976) 
C'è una spia nel mio letto (1976)
Quel movimento che mi piace tanto (1976) 
Frou-frou del tabarin (1976) 
Mazurka Di Fine Estate (1977) TV 
A Spiral of Mist (1977) 
Mannaja (1977) 
Stringimi forte papà (1977)
Disonora il padre (1978) TV
Bel-Ami (1979) TV
Il medium (1980)
L'ebreo fascista (1980)
Murder Obsession (Follia omicida) (1980) 
Peccato originale (1981)
Notturno con grida (1981) 
La sconosciuta (1982) TV
Investigatori d'Italia (1985) TV 
L'attrazione (1987)
My First Forty Years (1987) 
L'uomo che non voleva morire (1988) TV
I ragazzi della 3ª C (1988) TV   
The Betrothed (1989) TV
La stanza delle parole (1990) 
 (1990) TV 
Paprika (1991) 
In camera mia (1992) 
Catherine Courage (1993) TV 
The Teddy Bear (1994) 
The Voyeur (1994) 
Lia, rispondi (1997)
Non lasciamoci più (1999) TV 
La donna del delitto (2000)
Vento di ponente (2002) TV 
Il bello delle donne (2002) TV 
Sfiorarsi (2006): Odette
Il sangue e la rosa (2008) TV 
Caldo criminale (2010) TV 
Viso d'angelo (2011) TV
Colpi di fulmine (2012)

Further reading

References

External links 

 
 

1944 births
Actresses from Paris
Living people
French film actresses
French stage actresses
French television actresses
French emigrants to Italy
Writers from Paris
French children's writers
20th-century French actresses
21st-century French actresses
French women children's writers